Eschata isabella is a moth in the family Crambidae. It was described by Stanisław Błeszyński in 1965. It is found in Sichuan, China.

References

Chiloini
Moths described in 1965